USS Wild Goose and USS Wild Goose II have been the name of more than one United States Navy ship, and may refer to:

, a patrol vessel in commission from 1917 to 1920
, later USS SP-891, a patrol vessel in commission from 1917 to 1919 or 1920

Wild Goose